Supporters Direct are an umbrella organisation set up originally by the British government (with cross-party support) to provide support and assistance for its member trusts to secure a greater level of accountability and deliver democratic representation within football clubs and within football's governing structures. Its first managing director was Brian Lomax, founder of the first supporters' trust at Northampton Town F.C. Supporters Direct also works in other sports, most notably rugby league, as well as ice hockey. It is also funded by UEFA to work in football across Europe.

Amongst other things, Supporters Direct promotes the value of supporter and community engagement and helps supporters' trusts to secure influence and become a constructive voice in how their club is run. There are now over 200 supporters' trusts in the UK; clubs owned in partnership with supporters' trusts such as Swansea City A.F.C. and over 50 clubs owned by their supporters including Enfield Town FC, the first ever supporter owned football club in the United Kingdom, AFC Wimbledon, Exeter City F.C., Newport County and Wrexham F.C.

Existing as a Community Benefit Society, Supporters Direct is owned by its members and funded by a combination of the Fans Fund of the Football Stadia Improvement Fund, The RFL, UEFA. the Scottish Government, and member trust subscriptions. The consultancy Club Development allows SD to expand its work in other sports at all levels of the game.

Competitions

The Brian Lomax Supporters Direct Cup
The Brian Lomax Supporters Direct Cup is an annual invitational, pre-season friendly competition established by Supporters Direct. The cup is competed for between supporter-owned clubs and was first won by AFC Wimbledon, who beat Enfield Town, 3–2, on 12 August 2002 at Cheshunt. Other winners have been AFC Telford United, Brentford, Enfield Town and FC United of Manchester.  AFC Wimbledon have featured six times in the match and FC United made their fifth appearance in 2011.

In 2013, the Supporters Direct Cup featured a fixture between Scottish sides for the first time, with Dunfermline Athletic going head to head against Heart of Midlothian at East End Park on 13 July. Both sides at the time were in administration however, Dunfermline Athletic have since exited administration and are owned by fans group, Pars United. Hearts won the match 2–1.

The cup itself was paid for by subscriptions from supporters' trusts and individual fans, and is inscribed with Jock Stein's maxim, "Football without fans is nothing." In the spirit of the fixture, gate receipts from the match are split between competing clubs.

Finals

Supporters Direct Shield
The inaugural winners of the Shield were Scarborough Athletic who beat Merthyr Town 2–0 on 24 July 2010 at AFC Telford United.

Finals

See also
Supporters' trust
Football Supporters Europe

References

External links
Official website

Sports organisations of the United Kingdom
Co-operatives in the United Kingdom
Supporters' trusts